Ciprian Danciu (born 9 June 1977) is a Romanian former football player and currently a manager.

Honours

Player
FC Baia Mare
Divizia B: 1993–94
Dinamo București
Cupa României: 2002–03

Manager
Minaur Baia Mare
Liga III: 2021–22

References

External links
 
 
 

1977 births
Living people
Sportspeople from Baia Mare
Romanian footballers
Association football midfielders
ASC Oțelul Galați players
CS Minaur Baia Mare (football) players
AFC Rocar București players
FC Astra Giurgiu players
FC U Craiova 1948 players
FC Dinamo București players
Romanian expatriate footballers
Expatriate footballers in Qatar
Romanian expatriate sportspeople in Qatar
Al-Arabi SC (Qatar) players
Liga I players
Liga II players
Qatar Stars League players
Romanian football managers
CS Minaur Baia Mare (football) managers
CS Academica Recea managers